Polline Martignano is the 59th  of the Italian capital Rome, abbreviated as Z. LIX. It belongs to the Municipio XV and has 40 inhabitants (2016). It is located as an exclave in the northwest of the city and it is surrounded by the municipalities of Anguillara Sabazia, Campagnano di Roma and Trevignano Romano.

History 
The zone of Polline Martignano was founded on September 13, 1961, when, according to a resolution of the Commissario Straordinario, the Ager Romanus was divided into 59 zones, identified by the prefix Z. and a Roman numeral.

Geography 
The zone overlooks the Lake Martignano (lacus Alsietinus) and includes, at the border with Campagnano di Roma, the dried out Lake Stracciacappa (lacus Papyrianus). The zone is also very close to Lake Bracciano (lacus Sabatinus).

The territory of the zone includes the urban zone 20O Martignano.

Boundaries
Northward, Polline Martignano borders with the municipality of Trevignano Romano.

To the east, it shares the border with the comune of Campagnano di Roma.

Southward and westward, the zone borders with the comune of Anguillara Sabazia.

Odonymy
The zone only includes five roads, whose name recalls some local toponyms: Via Massa Clodiana, Via Montagna Spaccata, Via Piana del Pero, Lungolago di Polline, Via di Polline.

Places of interest

Civil buildings
 Torre di Stirpa Cappe. A 13th-century tower. 
The only architectural feature left of the medieval borough of Stirpe Cappe, that had strategical relevance in order to control the transit on the Via Cassia.
 Casale di Martignano. A 15th-century farmstead.

Natural areas
 Natural Regional Park of the Lakes Bracciano and Martignano
 Lake Martignano

References

External links
 Stracciacappe (lacus Papyrianus) e Acquedotto Paolo
 Stracciacappe (lacus Papyrianus)
 Cratere di Stracciacappe
 La Torre di Stracciacappe
 I laghi del Ducato di Bracciano

Subdivisions of Rome